Arhopala hercules is a butterfly in the family Lycaenidae. It was described by William Chapman Hewitson in 1862. It is found in the Australasian realm.

Subspecies
A. h. hercules New Guinea
A. h. leo Druce, 1894 Waigeu, New Guinea
A. h. droa (Evans, 1957) Papua, Sariba, Fergusson Island, Tagula, Yela
A. h. stymphelus Fruhstorfer, 1914 Obi, Bachan, Halmahera, Misool
A. h. tyrannus C. & R. Felder, [1865] Bachan, Halmahera
A. h. sophilus Fruhstorfer, 1914 Obi, Tanimbar,  West Irian
A. h. leontodamas (Toxopeus, 1930) Gebe, Misool
A. h. phalaereus Fruhstorfer, 1914 Jobi, Mioswar,  West Irian
A. h. herculina Staudinger, 1888 Waigeu

References

External links
Arhopala Boisduval, 1832 at Markku Savela's Lepidoptera and Some Other Life Forms. Retrieved June 3, 2017.

Arhopala
Butterflies described in 1862